The Deutsche Akademie, Fernsehen (DAfF) (German Television Academy) was founded in December 2010 by television professionals from various fields of television production. It has its headquarters in Munich and an office in Cologne.

Origin, purpose and activities 
According to its statutes, its purpose is

 to promote the development of German television as an essential component of German culture and the German cultural industry and to preserve its diversity
 to encourage, strengthen and cultivate discussion and the exchange of ideas and experience between German television professionals, especially between freelancers and those employed by broadcasters
 to lead the discourse on content and economic aspects of German television.

The chairman is actor Michael Brandner. His four deputies are screenwriter Jochen Greve, casting director Cornelia von Braun, set designer Frank Godt, and producer Stephan Ottenbruch from the television entertainment sector. Producer Frank Döhmann will assume the office of treasurer. The producer Gerhard Schmidt is the President of the Academy.

Of the 23 sections that had been planned (including direction, screenplay, music, documentary, acting, image design, sound design), some were constituted. The number of members is 800.

Every two months a nationwide "Jour fixe" takes place in the cities of Berlin, Cologne, Hamburg and Munich.

According to Vice Chairman Jochen Greve, one of the founding intentions was that "television should not be left to the broadcasters alone" The intention was rather: "We want to be a voice of the creative. We want to give people dignity."

In May 2018, the association participated in the establishment of the Themis-Vertrauensstelle gegen sexuelle Belästigung and Gewalt (Trust Centre against sexual harassment and violence).

Award ceremony 
Since 2013, the association has presented an annual award for achievements in all trades of television production. Each section of the Academy can nominate a prize in its own field. The Acting Section can nominate prizes in four categories: Best Actress in a Lead Role, Best Actor in a Lead Role, Best Actress in a Supporting Role and Best Actor in a Supporting Role. The winners are then chosen by all members of the Academy.

The winners of the awards since 2013 were:

Image Design 
 2013: Thomas Benesch, Mord in Eberswalde
 2014: Holly Fink, Spreewaldkrimi: Mörderische Hitze
 2015: Kolja Brandt, Naked Among Wolves
 2016: Jakub Bejnarowicz, 
 2017: Eeva Fleig, Blaumacher
 2018: Nikolaus Summerer, Dark
 2019: Philipp Haberlandt, Beat

Casting 
 2013: Sarah Lee and Nina Haun, Generation War
 2014: Heta Mantscheff, Weissensee, 2. Season
 2015: Marc Schötteldreier, 
 2016: Ulrike Müller, NSU German History X: Die Opfer – Vergesst mich nicht
 2017: Iris Baumüller, 4 Blocks
 2018: Anja Dihrberg, Bad Banks
 2019: Daniela Tolkien, Der Pass

Documentary film 
 2013: Eric Schulz, Karajan – Das zweite Leben
 2014: Martin Farkas and Dominik Graf, Es werde Stadt! 50 Jahre Grimme Preis in Marl
 2015: John Goetz and Poul-Erik Heilbuth, Jagd auf Snowden – Wie der Staatsfeind die USA blamierte
 2016: Birgit Schulz and Luzia Schmid, Zum Glück Deutschland – Ein anderer Blick auf unser Land
 2017: Till Schauder and Christoph Menardi, Glaubenskrieger
 2018: Katja Fedulova and Calle Overweg, Drei Engel, Russland – Glaube, Hoffnung, Liebe
 2019: Regina Schilling and Thomas Kufus, Kulenkampffs Schuhe

Screenplay 
 2013: Beate Langmaack, Blaubeerblau
 2014: Thomas Kirchner, Spreewaldkrimi: Mörderische Hitze
 2015: Michael Proehl, Tatort – Im Schmerz geboren
 2016: Magnus Vattrodt, Ein großer Aufbruch
 2017: Esther Bernstorff, Ein Teil von uns
 2018: Dorothee Schön, 
 2019: Dietrich Brüggemann, Tatort: Murot und das Murmeltier

Television journalism 
 2013: Monika Anthes and Eric Beres, Der Fall Mollath
 2014: Monika Anthes and Edgar Verheyen, Deutschlands Ferkelfabriken
 2015: Daniel Harrich and Ulrich Chaussy, Attentäter – Einzeltäter? – Neues vom Oktoberfestattentat
 2016: Rainald Becker and Christian H. Schulz, Schattenwelt BND – Wie viel Geheimdienst braucht Deutschland?
 2017: Christian Stücken, Die Story im Ersten: Der vertuschte Skandal
 2018: Stephan Lamby and Egmont R. Koch, Bimbes – Die schwarzen Kassen des Helmut Kohl
 2019: Frank Zintner, Dem Rechtsruck auf der Spur. Eine Zeitung sucht Antworten

Television entertainment 
 2013: Frank-Markus Barwasser, Pelzig hält sich
 2014: Anke Engelke, Anke hat Zeit
 2015: Lutz Heineking Jr., Endlich Deutsch!
 2016: Tim Mälzer and Sven Steffensmeier, Kitchen Impossible
 2017: Olli Schulz and Jan Böhmermann, Schulz und Böhmermann
 2018: Maren Kroymann, Philipp Käßbohrer and Matthias Murmann, Kroymann
 2019: Peter Wohlleben, Henning Gode, Bettina Böttinger, Der mit dem Wald spricht – unterwegs mit Peter Wohlleben

Film editing 
 2013: Jens Klüber, The Tower
 2014: Tina Freitag, Spreewaldkrimi: Mörderische Hitze
 2015: Ulf Albert, 
 2016: Claus Wehlisch, Polizeiruf 110 – Und vergib uns unsere Schuld
 2017: Claudia Wolscht, 
 2018: Janina Gerkens, Die Freibadclique
 2019: Barbara Brückner, Tatort: Anne und der Tod

Costume picture 
 2013: Wiebke Kratz, Generation War
 2014: Monika Hinz, Weissensee, 2. Season
 2015: Bettina Catharina Proske, Let's Go
 2016: Wiebke Kratz, Leberkäseland
 2017: Gabriele Binder, 
 2018: Pierre-Yves Gayraud, Babylon Berlin
 2019: Esther Amuser, Lotte am Bauhaus

Mask image 
 2013: Gerhard Zeiß, Generation War
 2014: Jens Bartram, Judith Müller and Katja Schulze, 
 2015: Gerhard Zeiss & Silka Lisku, Tannbach – Schicksal eines Dorfes
 2016: Astrid Weber and Hannah Fischleder, 
 2017: Jeanette Latzelsberger, Gregor Eckstein and Iris Peleira, Charité
 2018: Heiko Schmidt, Kerstin Gaecklein and Roman Braunhofer (Special Effects Maske), Babylon Berlin
 2019: Delia Mündelein and Sonja Fischer-Zeyen, Aufbruch in die Freiheit

Music 
 2013: Irmin Schmidt, Mord in Eberswalde
 2014: Ralf Wienrich, Spreewaldkrimi: Mörderische Hitze
 2015: Fabian Römer, Tannbach – Schicksal eines Dorfes
 2016: Christoph Zirngibl, Neben der Spur – Amnesie
 2017: Stefan Will and Marco Dreckkötter, 4 Blocks
 2018: Tom Tykwer and Johnny Klimek, Babylon Berlin
 2019: Ben Lukas Boysen and Paul Emmerich, Beat

Production 
 2013: Uli Putz and Jakob Claussen and Anja Föringer, Mobbing
 2014: Thomas Kufus, 24h Jerusalem
 2015: Michael Eckelt, 
 2016: Gabriela Sperl, Max Wiedemann, Quirin Berg and Sophie von Uslar, NSU German History X
 2017: Max Wiedemann, Quirin Berg, Eva Stadler, Karsten Rühle, Anke Greifeneder and Hannes Heyelmann, 4 Blocks
 2018: Lisa Blumenberg, Bad Banks
 2019: Eva Kemme, Tobias Siebert, Florian Deyle and Philip Schulz-Deyle, Alles Isy

Editorial office/Producing 
 2013: Barbara Buhl, Im Netz
 2014: Thomas Biehl, Solveig Willkommen and Birgit Brandes, Danni Lowinski, 5. Season
 2015: Claudia Simionescu, Der Fall Bruckner
 2016: Sascha Schwingel, Stefan Kruppa and Till Derenbach, 
 2017: Anke Greifeneder, 4 Blocks
 2018: Caroline von Senden, Alexandra Stain, Andreas Schreitmüller and Uta Cappel, Bad Banks
 2019: Philipp Käßbohrer and Matthias Murmann, How to Sell Drugs Online (Fast)

Director 
 2013: Philipp Kadelbach, Generation War
 2014: Kai Wessel, Spreewaldkrimi: Mörderische Hitze
 2015: Urs Egger, Der Fall Bruckner
 2016: Christian Schwochow, NSU German History X: Die Täter – Heute ist nicht alle Tage
 2017: Marvin Kren, 4 Blocks
 2018: Hans-Christian Schmid, Das Verschwinden
 2019: Isabel Kleefeld, Aufbruch in die Freiheit

Actor leading role 
 2013: Tom Schilling, Generation War
 2014: Roeland Wiesnekker, Spreewaldkrimi: Mörderische Hitze
 2015: Hans-Michael Rehberg, Schuld nach Ferdinand von Schirach: Schnee
 2016: Nicholas Ofczarek, Tatort – Die Geschichte vom bösen Friederich
 2017: Frederick Lau, 4 Blocks
 2018: Barry Atsma, Bad Banks
 2019: Thomas Schmauser, Der große Rudolph

Actress leading role 
 2013: Judy Winter, 
 2014: Christina Große, Neufeld, mitkommen!
 2015: Ina Weisse, 
 2016: Dagmar Manzel, Besuch, Emma
 2017: Rosalie Thomass, 
 2018: Petra Schmidt-Schaller, Eine gute Mutter
 2019: Anna Schudt, Aufbruch in die Freiheit
 2021: Aylin Tezel, Unbroken

Actress supporting role 
 2013: Katharina Thalbach, 
 2014: Barbara de Koy, Tatort: Am Ende des Flurs
 2015: Angela Winkler, Das Gewinnerlos
 2016: Stephanie Japp, Das Programm
 2017: Sandra Hüller, Crime Scene Cleaner – Özgür
 2018: Désirée Nosbusch, Bad Banks
 2019: Lena Urzendowsky, Der große Rudolph

Actor supporting role 
 2013: Christian Redl, Marie Brand und die offene Rechnung
 2014: Peter Jordan, Polizeiruf 110 – Abwärts
 2015: Ulrich Matthes, Bornholmer Straße
 2016: Björn Meyer, Crime Scene Cleaner – Pfirsichmelba
 2017: Ronald Kukulies, Tatort – Borowski und das Fest des Nordens
 2018: Albrecht Schuch, Bad Banks
 2019: Hans Löw, Alles Isy

Stunt 
 2013: Sandra Barger and Wanja Götz, Generation War
 2014: Christoph Domanski, Alarm, Cobra 11
 2015: Ronnie Paul, Tatort – Wer Wind erntet, sät Sturm!
 2016: Ronnie Paul, Zum Sterben zu früh
 2017: Tobias Nied, Alarm, Cobra 11 – Phantomcode
 2018: Dani Stein, Babylon Berlin
 2019: Wanja Götz and Lisa Maria Potthoff, Sarah Kohr: Das verschwundene Mädchen

Production design 
 2013: Thomas Stammer, Generation War
 2014: Frank Godt, Weissensee (2. Season)
 2015: Jill Schwarzer, Bissige Hande
 2016: Lars Lange, Ku'damm 56
 2017: Myrna Drews, Hedda
 2018: Albrecht Konrad, Gladbeck, and Udo Kramer, Dark
 2019: Andrea Kessler, Aufbruch in die Freiheit

Sound design 
 2013: Jan Petzold (Ton) and Gerald Cronauer (Mischung), Im Netz
 2015: Thomas Warneke, Andreas Hintzsch and Clemens Grulich, Die Schneekönigin
 2016: Eric Rueff, Frank Mareite, Stefan Kolleck and Malte Zurbonsen, Weinberg
 2017: Tomáš Bělohradský, Thomas Neumann and Gregor Bonse, The Same Sky
 2018: Patrick Veigel (Ton) and Florian Beck (Mischung), Das Verschwinden
 2019: Herbert Verdino (O-Ton), Nico Krebs (Mischung and Sounddesign) and Wolfi Müller (Geräuschemacher), Der Pass

VFX/Animation 
 2015: Denis Behnke, Naked Among Wolves
 2016: Denis Behnke, 
 2017: Jan Adamczyk and Denis Behnke, The Same Sky
 2018: Robert Pinnow, Babylon Berlin
 2019: Viktor Muller and Vít Komrzý, Das Boot

References

External links 
 Official website

Television in Germany
Culture in Munich
Cultural organisations based in Germany
Education in Munich
2010 establishments in Germany
German television awards